Salix helvetica, the Swiss willow, is a scrubby willow species found in the Alps (from 1700 to 2700m) and the Tatras portion of the western Carpathians (from 1600 to 2000m). It has gained the Royal Horticultural Society's Award of Garden Merit.

References

helvetica
Flora of Central Europe
Flora of Southwestern Europe
Flora of Southeastern Europe
Plants described in 1789